Anastasia Andreyevna Smirnova (born 31 August 2002) is a Russian freestyle skier. She is a 2021 World Champion in dual moguls.

Career
She competed at the FIS Freestyle Ski and Snowboarding World Championships 2019, where she placed fourth in the moguls. She won her first medal at the FIS Freestyle World Ski Championships in 2021, in moguls, and a second medal in dual moguls, after she finished first in the final run where she competed with teammate Viktoriia Lazarenko. She is the first Russian dual moguls champion.

World Cup podiums

Individual podiums
 0 wins – (0 MO, 0 DM)
 3 podiums – (2 MO, 1 DM)

References

External links

2002 births
Living people
Russian female freestyle skiers
Olympic freestyle skiers of Russia
Freestyle skiers at the 2022 Winter Olympics
People from Chusovoy
Medalists at the 2022 Winter Olympics
Olympic bronze medalists for the Russian Olympic Committee athletes
Olympic medalists in freestyle skiing
Sportspeople from Perm Krai
21st-century Russian women